7G Rainbow Colony is a 2004 Indian romantic drama film written and directed by Selvaraghavan. The film is shot simultaneously in Tamil and Telugu languages, the latter titled 7G Brindavan Colony. It stars debutant Ravi Krishna and Sonia Agarwal. The music is scored by Yuvan Shankar Raja while Arvind Krishna performed the cinematography. The film deals with unrequited love of a boy towards a girl.

Released on 15 October 2004, the film received critical acclaim and was commercially successful. Ravi Krishna received the Filmfare Best Male Debut (South) for his performance, whilst Yuvan Shankar Raja was awarded the Filmfare Best Music Director Award for his highly praised musical score.

Plot
The movie begins with Kadhir heading to work. He appears distracted throughout the day and even instructs his assistant to postpone an important meeting with a big client. He then waits for someone at Marina Beach in Chennai (Hussain Sagar in Hyderabad in the Telugu version) with a bouquet of flowers. His best friend, Lakshmi, sees him and asks him whom he is waiting for. Kadhir explains that he is waiting to meet his girlfriend Anita for their date. In flashbacks, we are shown how Kadhir first met Anita.

Kadhir belongs to a lower middle class family, living with his parents and younger sister in Rainbow Colony in Chennai (Brindavan Colony, Hyderabad in the Telugu version). He is perceived as a good-for-nothing person as he skips classes, fails exams, and gets involved in fights. Kadhir believes that his father hates him and often quarrels with him, even threatening to leave the house, only to be persuaded not to do so by his mother. Kadhir’s life changes when a once well-lived family moves into the same colony due to loss in business. Kadhir is attracted to the daughter of his new neighbour, Anita. Although he tries to woo her, Anita treats him with disdain. One day, Kadhir confesses to Anita that he loves her. He tells her that having always been ridiculed, he found respite in the fact that she at least bothered to look at him. He promises to wipe her thoughts out of his mind, as he is not right for her.

Despite himself, Kadhir continues pursuing her. Anita realizes that Kadhir is not such a useless fellow when Lakshmi tells her that he has seen Kadhir dismantle and assemble a motorcycle within minutes each time they steal a bike to get drunk. Anita takes Kadhir to a Hero Honda dealer and asks them to give him a job. He is promised a job if he can assemble a bike. Initially, the lethargic Kadhir is disinterested and gives up the task. Anita takes him to the washroom and slaps him before revealing that she has fallen in love with him. She then tells him that they can only be together if he gets a proper job and gets his life straightened out. Kadhir then demonstrates his skill in motorcycle assembly, securing a good job with the dealer.

Later that evening, Kadhir plans a treat for his friends. However, Anita confronts him and makes him break the good news to his parents first to get their blessings. However, Kadhir’s father berates him as usual for getting a job instead of completing college. Then later at night, Kadhir overhears his father telling his mother how proud he is of their son since getting a job at such a prestigious company, which is not easy. The only reason the father did not openly praise Kadhir is because he feared his son might misjudge him for giving him respect, only now that he is earning money for their household. Only then does Kadhir realize his father's love for him and weeps in joy. The intimacy between Kadhir and Anita is discovered by her mother, and she refuses to allow them to continue dating even as Kadhir’s father tries to persuade her otherwise. Anita's family is heavily indebted to another Northern Indian family that has been supporting them since Anita's father suffered losses in his business. Anita's parents want Anita to marry the son of the family that has helped them.

Using her friend's marriage as a ruse and with unwitting help of her friend's aunt, Anita escapes her home and travels with Kadhir to a tourist place near Thekkady in Kerala, and they end up in a hotel room. Anita reveals that she has made the biggest decision of her life by deciding to make love to him, as he should not regret falling in love with her when she marries the man her parents chose. Though stunned by her decision, Kadhir goes with her plan and the two consummate their love. The next morning, Kadhir and Anita argue when Kadhir says he wants Anita to live with him, while Anita accuses him of being attracted to her only because of the sex. They continue arguing as they exit the hotel, which culminates in Kadhir slapping Anita in anger, causing her to cross the road alone in tears. While a guilt-ridden Kadhir calls out to Anita, she is knocked down by a truck as a helpless Kadhir watches, then also hit by another speeding vehicle. Anita dies gruesomely on the spot as she is subsequently run over by several vehicles and Kadhir is injured. The following day, he is shocked to find the mere remains of Anita in the hospital mortuary. Though heartbroken, Kadhir tells the police that Anita never accepted his love, and her death was really an accident. This way, he saves her dignity, and her mother blesses him as she leaves. Though the police want to file a murder case on Kadhir, Anita's mother refuses to name him as a murderer. After sadly returning to Chennai, Kadhir tries to commit suicide unsuccessfully, only to end up causing a ruckus in traffic and being assaulted by the crowd, but is saved by a group of nuns. He then hallucinates about Anita's spirit coming to him and advising him to live life to the fullest and that she will always be with him.

Back in the present day, it is revealed that Kadhir has become successful in his life but has remained mentally damaged since Anita's death. He still believes that she is alive and always imagines talking to her. The film ends with Kadhir talking to himself at the beach, thinking that he is talking to Anita.

Cast

Production
7G Rainbow Colony was the second venture of Selvaraghavan as a director. He revealed that the film's inspiration came from his college days when he had been fascinated with a Punjabi girl during his education in KK Nagar. He based several of the scenes on real-life happenings with his friends, revealing that the film was "75% biographical" and the lead character was an "average guy" like himself, who "no one would make a film on".

Selva cast Ravikrishna, son of producer Rathnam after a successful screen test. For the lead female role, Selvaraghavan initially considered Genelia D'Souza and auditioned Mumbai model Mamta Zaveri, who was to work with Dhanush in Sibi Chakravarthy's shelved film Raghava. The film later began production with Swathi Reddy in her first lead role, though she later opted out and was replaced by Sonia Agarwal due to her Punjabi origin.

Soundtrack 

Selvaraghavan teamed up once again with musician Yuvan Shankar Raja after Thulluvadho Ilamai and Kaadhal Kondein. The soundtrack released on 21 May 2004 and features 10 tracks overall, two of which are Instrumentals. The lyrics were penned by Na. Muthukumar. Yuvan Shankar Raja used live music for the score, for which he worked with a 40-piece orchestra for one month. The theme music is inspired by Johnny (1980). As it was the case with Kaadhal Kondein, an "Original Soundtrack", consisting of 25 tracks, which are pieces of the film score and were titled as "Theme Music", was released afterwards. It includes one bit song "Idhu Enna Maatram" (Theme Music 14), sung by legendary singer P. B. Sreenivas. Yuvan Shankar Raja has given a Madhuvanti in "Kanaa Kaanum Kaalangal".

Composer Yuvan Shankar Raja received universal critical acclaim for the musical score as the songs and the film score were hailed as "excellent" and the album as a "great" and "must buy". Particularly, the instrumental track in the album was very much lauded, described as "highly innovative" and "eminently haunting" and even hailed as "one of the most haunting instrumental tracks ever". The song became very popular and were topping the charts for some time. Yuvan Shankar Raja received his first Filmfare Best Music Director Award in Tamil for the music, at the age of 25, becoming the youngest composer ever to win this award till 2011 when GV Prakash Kumar won Filmfare Best Music Director Award in Tamil for his work in, Aadukalam.

Track listing

Release 
Rediff said that "Selvaraghavan has once again displayed his skill making a movie that is touching without being mushy, and believable because of its realism". Idlebrain gave the film a rating of three-and-three quarters out of five and noted that "Doing a tragic climax and making it commercially acceptable is one hell of a task. And Sri Raghava succeeded in it".

Awards

Filmfare Awards South  2004
 Filmfare Best Music Director Award (Tamil) – Yuvan Shankar Raja
 Filmfare Best Male Debut (Tamil) – Ravi Krishna

Santosham Film Awards Telugu
 Best Debut Actor Award - Ravi Krishna
 Best Musical hit album - Yuvan Shankar Raja

Box office
The Tamil version opened in 92 screens and expanded to 118 prints. Made on a budget of  3 crore, it turned profitable yielding a distributor share of  10 crore. The Telugu version opened in 35 screens and expanded to 80 prints.

Remakes

References

External links
 

2004 films
Tamil films remade in other languages
Telugu films remade in other languages
2004 romantic drama films
Films directed by Selvaraghavan
Films scored by Yuvan Shankar Raja
2000s Tamil-language films
2000s Telugu-language films
Romantic drama films based on actual events
Indian romantic drama films
Indian multilingual films
2004 multilingual films